Phyllonorycter lantanella is a moth of the family Gracillariidae. It is found in all of Europe, except Scandinavia, Ireland and the Balkan Peninsula.

The wingspan is about 9 mm. There are two generations per year with adults on wing in May and again in August.

The larvae feed on the wayfaring tree (Viburnum lantana), guelder rose (Viburnum opulus), laurestine (Viburnum tinus) and rowan (Sorbus aucuparia), mining the leaves of their host plant. They create a lower-surface tentiform mine between two side veins. Pupation takes place within the mine without a recognisable cocoon.

References

External links

lantanella
Moths described in 1802
Moths of Europe
Taxa named by Franz von Paula Schrank